Waldburg is a municipality in the district of Freistadt in the Austrian state of Upper Austria.

Geography 

Waldburg is lies in the Mühlviertel. The Jaunitz creek and the Kronbach creek flow through the Waldburg region. The "Sepp'n Höhe" is, at 780 m above sea level, Waldburg's highest point.

Subdivisions

 Freudenthal
 Harruck
 Lahrndorf
 Marreith
 Mitterreith
 Oberschwandt
 Prechtleinschlag
 Sankt Peter
 Schöndorf
 Unterschwandt
 Waldburg

Sights
The parish church of Waldburg has three magnificent late-gothic winged altars. The High Altar is sacred to Mary Magdalene. The right Side Altar is sacred to Saint Wolfgang and the left Side Altar is sacred to Saint Catherine.

Museum Mini Agrimundus: Traditional miniatures from rural living.

Twin towns 
Waldburg ist twinned with Waldburg a town in the district of Ravensburg in Baden-Württemberg in Germany.

References

Cities and towns in Freistadt District